Leonurus sibiricus, commonly called honeyweed or Siberian motherwort, is an herbaceous plant species native to China, Mongolia, and Siberia. It has verticillaster inflorescence. It is naturalized in many other parts of the world, including South, Central and North Americas.

Description
Plants have long petioled basal leaves that are ovate-cordate in shape. The leaves have toothed  margins and are incised with deeply cut lobes. Typically one or a few flowering stems are produced from short tap-roots. The lower stem leaves are deciduous and wither away as the plants begin blooming. The flowers are produced in many flowered verticillasters, produced in whorls around the top half or more of the stem. The corolla is white or reddish to purple-red, with an upper lip that is oblong in shape and longer than the lower lip. When flowering is done, brown oblong shaped nutlets are produced in good number. Blooming occurs from July into late September, but flowering can occur year-round when climate permits.

This species' habitat within its natural range is stony or sandy grasslands or pine forests.

Alkaloids

Alkaloids isolated from the plant include:

Cycloleonurinine
Leoheterin 
Leonurine
Leonurinine
Leuronurine
Prehispanolone
Preleoheterin
Stachydrine

References

External links
plants.usda.gov
Herbarium

Lamiaceae
Flora of China
Flora of Mongolia
Flora of Siberia
Plants described in 1753
Taxa named by Carl Linnaeus